Bruno Lafont (born 8 June 1956) is a French businessman. He served as the chief executive officer of Lafarge  from 2006 to 2015, when it merged with Holcim to become LafargeHolcim. He served as the co-chairman of LafargeHolcim from 2015 to April 2017.

Early life
Lafont was born in 1956. He graduated from HEC Paris in 1977 as well as the École nationale d'administration in Paris.

Career
Lafont joined Lafarge as an auditor in the finance department in 1983, He subsequently worked in Germany and Turkey. He was appointed as its CEO on January 1, 2006. Under his tenure, he oversaw the international expansion of Lafarge to 70 countries, including the acquisition of minority shareholders in Lafarge North America. Additionally, he cut costs by 60% within the first year, notably by divesting from its roof-manufacturing subsidiary. By December 2008, he acquired Orascom Cement, a subsidiary of Orascom Construction Industries, for €8.8 billion, and he brought billionaires Albert Frère and Nassef Sawiris to Lafarge's board. He stepped down as CEO in 2015, shortly after its merger with Holcim. He was awarded a €2.5 million bonus for it. He served as the co-chairman of LafargeHolcim until April 2017.

Lafont serves on the boards of directors of Électricité de France and ArcelorMittal. He is an advisor to the mayor of Chongqing in China. He is also the chairman of the Fondation nationale pour l'enseignement de la gestion.

Personal life
Lafont is married to Marie-Constance de Maistre, a violinist and a descendant of Joseph de Maistre.

Works

References

1956 births
Living people
People from Boulogne-Billancourt
Lycée Louis-le-Grand alumni
HEC Paris alumni
École nationale d'administration alumni
French chief executives
French chairpersons of corporations
French corporate directors
Électricité de France people
Chevaliers of the Légion d'honneur